Semiramis Pekkan (born 30 September 1948) is a Turkish retired film actress and singer.

Career 
She is the youngest daughter of her family. Pekkan's mother was a housewife and her father was a military officer. She started her career with the movie Kara Memed directed by Tunç Başaran. Semiramis Pekkan has appeared as a guest actor on the Meydan Stage between 1965 and 1966. She started her music career in 1968 and got Gold Record Award in the following years. After getting married, she ended her career in cinema and music. She has three studio albums that were released with Columbia, Odeon and Kervan music labels.

Discography

45rpms 
 Bu Ne Biçim Hayat (Those Were The Days) / İçelim Kendimizden Geçelim (Columbia-1968)
 Olmaz Bu İş Olamaz / Samanlık Seyran Olur (Columbia-1968)
 Köy Düğünü / Tanrı Verdi Çalmadım Ki (Columbia-1968)
 Ne Geçti Elime / Eski Sandal (Columbia-1969)
 Ben Böyleyim / Bir Dost Ararım (Columbia-1969)
 Vur Patlasın Çal Oynasın / Bile Bile (Odeon-1970)
 Eskisi Gibi Değilim / Dert Ortağım (Odeon-1970)
 Ararım Sorarım / Bir Gün Elime Düşersin (Odeon-1970)
 Senden Vazgeçmem / Sen Ne Dersinde Olmaz (Odeon-1971)
 Gülelim Sevelim / O Karanlık Gecelerde (Odeon-1971)
 Bu Gece Kaçır Beni / Keyfine Bak (Odeon-1972)
 Düşmanlarım Çatlasın / İndim Yarin Bahçesine (Odeon-1972)
 Çöpçatan / Sevgilim Dermisin (Kervan-1973)
 Sen Hayatsın Ben Ömür / Ya O Ya Ben (Kervan-1974)
 Neydi Neydi Ne / Ne İsen (Kervan-1974)
 Unuttu Unuttu / Bana Yalan Söylediler (Kervan-1974)
 Doğum Günün Kutlu Olsun / İki Kere Ağlamışım (Kervan-1975)
 İyiler Kötüye Düşer / O Var Ya (Kervan-1975)

Albums 
 Semiramis (1970)
 Semiramis (1972)
 Semiramis (1975)

Filmography 
The movies she had a role in include:

References

External links

Actresses from Istanbul
Singers from Istanbul
20th-century Turkish actresses
1948 births
Living people
Lalvani family